"Loving You" is a song by British singer-songwriter Chris Rea, released in 1982 as the lead single from his fourth studio album Chris Rea. It was written by Rea and produced by Jon Kelly and Rea. "Loving You" reached No. 65 in the UK Singles Chart and remained in the Top 100 for three weeks. It also peaked at No. 88 on the US Billboard Hot 100.

"Loving You" features an eighteen-piece string section. A music video was filmed to promote the single, directed by Dave Mallett.

Critical reception
On its release, Billboard listed the song as a recommended 'Pop' choice under their "Top Single Picks". Cash Box listed the single as one of their "feature picks" during February 1982. They wrote: "Rea sounds a little more raspy-throated since the monster "Fool (If You Think It's Over)" in 1978 but his music still has that slick, thick production sound, like a pop blues." In a review of Chris Rea, The Philadelphia Inquirer described the song as "especially appealing" on an album of "superbly structured songs, mostly in the ballad form".

Track listing
7" single
 "Loving You" – 3:47
 "Let Me Be the One" – 3:42

7" single (Japanese release)
 "Loving You" – 3:47
 "One Sweet Tender Touch" – 3:48

7" single (US promo)
 "Loving You" – 3:44
 "Loving You" – 3:44

12" single
 "Loving You" – 3:47
 "Let Me Be the One" – 3:42

Personnel
Loving You
 Chris Rea - vocals, guitar, electric piano, piano
 Carol Kenyon, Katie Kissoon, Linda Taylor - backing vocals
 Jim Mullen - guitar
 Bruce Lynch - bass
 Dave Mattacks - drums
 Andrew Powell - string arrangement

Production
 Jon Kelly - producer, engineer
 Chris Rea - producer

Charts

References

1982 songs
1982 singles
Magnet Records singles
Songs written by Chris Rea
Chris Rea songs